Janet Morley is a British author, poet, and Christian feminist.

Her books Celebrating Women (1986, co-edited with Hannah Ward) and All Desires Known (1988) established Morley as a campaigner for inclusive 'non-sexist' language in Christian liturgy.
Her prayer For the darkness of waiting, written in 1985, "grew out of long years of campaigning for women's vocations to be recognised" by the Church of England: it has been used at national events celebrating women's ministry including the Liturgy of Hope at Canterbury Cathedral on 18 April 1986, and the service Celebrating 25 Years of Women Priests at Lambeth Palace on 1 March 2019 (read by Sally Hitchiner).
Her prayer O God who brought us to birth, and in whose arms we die, first published in 1985, appears in Common Worship, part of the official liturgical resource of the Church of England.
Critics acclaim her anthologies of poetry:
The Heart's Time (2011),
Haphazard by Starlight (2013), 
Our Last Awakening (2016), 
and Love Set You Going (2019).

Biography

Morley studied English at New Hall, Cambridge (now Murray Edwards College), pursued biblical studies at King's College London, and received a Postgraduate Certificate in Education at the University of Newcastle upon Tyne.

She has worked in adult religious education for Christian Aid and for the Methodist Church of Great Britain, in the Methodist Connexional Team and at Wesley House, as formational tutor and as the founding Commissioning Editor of Holiness, its open access peer-reviewed journal.
She edited the volumes of Holiness for 2015 and 2016.

Caring responsibilities for others have included raising children, caring for her six grandchildren, and looking after elderly relatives as they live with dementia.

Like her mother and her father, she has been a church-going member of the Church of England her whole life.

Member of St Hilda Community

Morley was a member of the St Hilda Community, contributing liturgy eventually published in All Desires Known.

The St Hilda Community was a group of women and men who met for worship each Sunday, from February 1987 until at least 1991, first at St Benet's, the chapel of Queen Mary College (now QMUL), and later at Bow Road Methodist Church.
Although there was an ongoing campaign, since at least 1975, by the Movement for the Ordination of Women to allow the ordination of women to the priesthood, the General Synod of the Church of England would not vote in favour of women priests until November 1992.
A purpose of the St Hilda Community was to offer a 'non-sexist liturgy' that "gave full space and authority to women, without apology, secrecy, or shame".
Another purpose was that its members could "receive the broader vision of our Christian heritage and women's spiritual offerings in language which excludes no person and no image of God".
The community decided to hold eucharists celebrated by women priests lawfully ordained in other countries, despite this practice being declared "illegal" by Graham Leonard, then Bishop of London.
Resident in London for doctoral studies, American priest Suzanne Fageol accepted the invitation to be priest to the community.
Fageol used texts by Morley, such as the Eucharistic prayer for Easter, celebrated on Easter Day 1987. Fageol writes:

Watson discusses both the St Hilda Community and Morley's book Celebrating Women with Hannah Ward.

Bibliography

All Desires Known

The first edition, a green paperback jointly published by the Movement for the Ordination of Women and Women in Theology in 1988, divides into three parts: Collects, Formal Prayers, and Psalms and Poems.

Introducing the book, Morley writes:

She also writes, concerning her use of feminine language for God:

There is a collect for each Sunday and major weekday festival of the church's lectionary year, written weekly from Advent 1986 to Advent 1987, guided by the eucharistic lectionary of the 1980 Alternative Service Book.

Items were written for regular use by the Women in Theology liturgy group and the St Hilda Community, and for special occasions including: the Liturgy of Hope, Canterbury Cathedral, 18 April 1986; a communion service for women only at Holy Trinity House, Paddington, on Christmas Eve 1986; the opening of holy orders to women in the Diocese of London on 31 March 1987 at St Mary-le-Bow; and the Greenham vigil, on Maundy Thursday 1987, by Christian women at Blue Gate, Greenham Common Women's Peace Camp.

The second edition is substantially expanded, with forty-two additional pieces of writing. The cover features a painting Red Canna (circa 1923) by Georgia O'Keeffe, from the collection of the University of Arizona Museum of Art, a gift of Oliver James.

Collections of Prayers

As well as All Desires Known, Morley is author or editor of several collections of prayers and worship material.

Anthologies of Poetry
Starting in 2011, Morley has published a series of poetry anthologies on different themes.

Talks

 Haphazard by Starlight: an Advent Pilgrimage, talk in the Sunday Forum, St Paul's Cathedral, 3  December 2013.
 Guarding the ‘holy fire’: dementia and the mystery of love, annual Joseph Winter lecture, delivered to the churches in Wakefield, July 2017.
 Whatsoever things are true...whatsoever things are lovely...think on these things, sermon preached before the University of Cambridge, 15 October 2017.
 Love Set You Going, talk at the Church Times Festival of Faith and Literature, Bloxham School, 21 February 2020.

Reception

Elaine Graham writes that Morley's Collects are "some of the most well-known, and widely-used, feminist prayers".

Muriel Orevillo-Montenegro writes that Morley's Eucharistic Prayer for Christmas Eve "expresses beautifully the connection between Jesus' blood and women's menstruation".

Mary Grey writes, regarding and you held me: "Clearly an erotic experience is being described, yes, of darkness, but also of longing, surrender, akin to aching for God. It highlights...the mystics' use of eros, desire, longing, with definite sexual connotations, which evokes an embodied form of mysticism."

Wilma Jakobsen writes that Morley's O God, the Power of the Powerless "particularly spoke to us as South African women in the complexities of our struggles, and we used it frequently. Morley's images of persistence and power in the midst of powerlessness, and of God as the source of strength for those who are powerless, encouraged us to keep on proclaiming the truth."

Malcolm Doney writes, in his review of Love Set You Going, that Morley is "noted for her excellent magpie collections of poetry, prayers, and rites".

Jenny Daggers describes Morley's "major contribution in writing liturgical material and writing about liturgical language".

References

External links
 http://coalpitheath.org.uk/graphics/sermons/prayer_2013-02.pdf (February 2013)
 https://spckpublishing.co.uk/blog/q-a-with-janet-morley.html (December 2018)
 https://spckpublishing.co.uk/blog/national-poetry-day.html (September 2019)

Living people
English women poets
Anglican poets
English feminist writers
Alumni of the University of Cambridge
Alumni of New Hall, Cambridge
Alumni of King's College London
Year of birth missing (living people)